Gabriella Maria Papadakis (born 10 May 1995) is a French ice dancer. With her partner, Guillaume Cizeron, she is a 2022 Olympic champion, 2018 Olympic silver medalist, a five-time World champion (2015–2016, 2018–2019, 2022), a five-time consecutive European champion (2015–2019), the 2017 and 2019 Grand Prix Final champion, and a seven-time French national champion (2015–2020, 2022). They have won ten gold medals on the Grand Prix series. Earlier in their career, they won silver at the 2012 Junior Grand Prix Final and at the 2013 World Junior Championships.

Papadakis and Cizeron have broken world records 34 times, which is in itself a record across all figure skating disciplines since the introduction of the ISU Judging System in 2004. They are the current and historical world record holders in the short dance, free dance, and combined total. They are the first team to have broken the 90-point barrier in the rhythm dance, 120-point and 130-point barriers in the free dance, and the first team to score above the 200-point, 210-point, and 220-point barriers in the combined total score.

The pair are recognized for their graceful and balletic style. Their programs, inspired by modern dance, have been described as lyrical, and commentators have frequently acclaimed the quality of their skating skills.

Personal life
Gabriella Papadakis was born on 10 May 1995 in Clermont-Ferrand, France. She is the daughter of Catherine, a French skating coach, and Emmanuel, the owner of a food truck in Austin, Texas. Her father is from Korydallos, Greece, and his family has roots in Crete.

She relocated from France to Montreal, Quebec, Canada, on 14 July 2014 in order to continue to train with Romain Haguenauer, who had moved to Gadbois Centre.

Career

2009–10 season
Papadakis and Cizeron teamed up when they were about 9 or 10 years old in Clermont-Ferrand at the suggestion of her mother, Catherine Papadakis, who coached them from the beginning of their partnership. They debuted on the ISU Junior Grand Prix series in 2009–10, placing 15th at JGP United States. They were 22nd at the 2010 World Junior Championships.

2010–11 season 
In 2010–11, Papadakis/Cizeron finished 4th at JGP France and then won bronze at their second event, in Austria. They advanced to 12th at the 2011 World Junior Championships.

2011–12 season 
In 2011–12, Papadakis/Cizeron finished 4th at both of their Junior Grand Prix events. They rose to 5th at the 2012 World Junior Championships.

2012–13 season 
In mid-June 2012, Papadakis/Cizeron decided to move to Lyon to train with new coaches Muriel Zazoui, Romain Haguenauer, and Olivier Schoenfelder. They competed in their fourth season of the Junior Grand Prix, winning their first title at JGP France and then taking another gold medal at JGP Austria, where they scored their personal best of 142.08 points. Their wins qualified them for the 2012–13 JGP Final in Sochi, Russia. Papadakis/Cizeron won the silver medal in Sochi behind Russian ice dancers Alexandra Stepanova / Ivan Bukin. At the 2013 World Junior Championships in Milan, the French placed second in the short dance. On the day of the free dance, Papadakis sprained her ankle in an off-ice warm-up before the morning practice. During the competition, she paused after 2:52 minutes and was allowed a medical break, after which she and Cizeron completed the dance. They placed third in the free dance and second overall, stepping onto the podium along with gold medalists Stepanova/Bukin and bronze medalists Aldridge/Eaton.

2013–14 season
Papadakis/Cizeron decided to move up to the senior level for the 2013–14 season. They made their senior international debut at the International Cup of Nice, winning gold. The duo then competed at two senior Grand Prix assignments, placing fifth at the 2013 Trophée Eric Bompard and seventh at the 2013 Rostelecom Cup. Initially named as alternates for the 2014 European Championships, they were called up when Nathalie Péchalat / Fabian Bourzat withdrew. They placed 15th at the event, held in January in Budapest, and 13th at the 2014 World Championships, held in March in Saitama.

2014–15 season
In July 2014, Papadakis/Cizeron relocated with Haguenauer to Montreal, Quebec, Canada. Marie-France Dubreuil, Patrice Lauzon, and Pascal Denis joined Haguenauer as the duo's coaches. Their free dance was inspired by a ballet, Le Parc. The two began their season by winning an ISU Challenger Series event, the 2014 Skate Canada Autumn Classic, where they defeated Piper Gilles / Paul Poirier. In November, Papadakis/Cizeron reached their first Grand Prix podium, winning gold at the 2014 Cup of China ahead of Maia Shibutani / Alex Shibutani and 2014 World champions Anna Cappellini / Luca Lanotte. Beating Gilles/Poirier again, they took their second GP title at the 2014 Trophée Éric Bompard and qualified for their first Grand Prix Final. At the latter event, held in December 2014 in Barcelona, they placed fifth in the short dance, third in the free dance, and third overall behind Kaitlyn Weaver / Andrew Poje and Madison Chock / Evan Bates.

In January 2015, Papadakis/Cizeron ranked first in both segments at the 2015 European Championships in Stockholm and took the gold medal by a margin of 8.45 points over the World champions, Anna Cappellini / Luca Lanotte. In March, they competed at the World Championships in Shanghai, China. Ranked fourth in the short dance and first in the free dance, they finished first overall ahead of Madison Chock / Evan Bates, whom they outscored by 2.94 points. They were the first French skaters to win a World title since 2008 and the youngest World champions in ice dance in 49 years.

2015–16 season
On 28 August 2015, Papadakis sustained a cerebral concussion after a fall in practice. According to Dubreuil, "They clipped each other's blades, and she fell right on her head. The symptoms were instant. We could see she was walking wobbly; she had trouble putting words together." Subsequently, Papadakis/Cizeron withdrew from the Master's de Patinage in Orléans scheduled in the second week of October. On 12 November 2015, they withdrew from their Grand Prix events, the 2015 Trophée Éric Bompard and 2015 NHK Trophy. Doctors were uncertain about how long her recovery would take. In March 2016, Papadakis said, "I couldn't go out, skate, read, or have a conversation with people. It was impossible to concentrate. I still have some symptoms."

Papadakis/Cizeron returned to competition in December to win their second national title. The following month, at the 2016 European Championships in Bratislava, Papadakis/Cizeron placed second to Italy's Anna Cappellini / Luca Lanotte in the short dance. They were first in the free dance and won their second consecutive European title.

In March, a skate blade hit Papadakis' knee while she was practicing steps with Cizeron. According to Haguenauer, "Her knee was open, she had eight stitches, but it's superficial," and she resumed training on 21 March. Papadakis/Cizeron placed first in the short dance at the 2016 World Championships in Boston, ahead of Maia Shibutani / Alex Shibutani of the United States. They set a world record score in the free program of 118.17, beating the previous world record held by Meryl Davis / Charlie White of the United States of 116.63 at the 2014 Winter Olympics. They won the competition with a personal best overall score of 194.46, 6.03 points ahead of Maia Shibutani / Alex Shibutani. The duo withdrew from their final competition of the season, the 2016 Team Challenge Cup in April 2016, because Papadakis had a mild case of mononucleosis.

2016–17 season
Competing in the 2016–17 Grand Prix series, Papadakis/Cizeron won gold at the 2016 Trophée de France and silver at the 2016 NHK Trophy, behind Canada's Tessa Virtue / Scott Moir. In December 2016, they received the silver medal at the Grand Prix Final in Marseille, France, finishing second again to Virtue/Moir.  With numerous small mistakes popping up they were showing the most vulnerability since their rise to the top and were only 3rd in the short dance of this event behind Shibutani/Shibutani.

In January 2017, Papadakis/Cizeron won their third continental title at the European Championships in Ostrava, Czech Republic, although they were only 3rd in the short dance behind Ekaterina Bobrova/Dmitri Soloviev and Anna Cappellini/Luca Lanotte. At the 2017 World Figure Skating Championships they came in as underdogs after their previous defeats to Virtue/Moir.  They won the free dance portion handily with a new personal best and free dance world record of 119.15 points, but due to another subpar performance in the short dance, lost for a 3rd straight time to Virtue/Moir, taking the silver medal.

2017–18 season
For the 2017-18 Grand Prix season, Papadakis and Cizeron were assigned to the Cup of China and the Internationaux de France. At the Cup of China, they set their new short dance personal best of 81.10, a new free dance world record of 119.33 points, and a new overall world record becoming the first team to surpass 200 points with 200.43 points. At the 2017 Internationaux de France they set another short dance personal best of 81.40, a new free dance personal best and world record of 120.58 points, and a new overall world record of 201.98 points.

Papadakis and Cizeron won their first ever Grand Prix Final, setting another new short program personal best of 82.07 points, and a new overall world record of 202.16. They won their 4th consecutive European Championships ice dancing title, the first team to accomplish that since Marina Klimova/Sergei Ponomarenko from 1989 to 1992, handily winning both programs.

At the 2018 Winter Olympics in Pyeongchang, Papadakis and Cizeron finished second in the short dance with a score of 81.93 despite Papadakis suffering a wardrobe malfunction, and first in the free skate with a world record score of 123.35, to claim the silver medal. Papadakis and Cizeron finished the season at the World Championships, where claimed their third title with world record scores in the short dance, free dance, and overall.

2018–19 season
For the 2018-2019 Grand Prix Season, Papadakis and Cizeron were assigned to 2018 NHK Trophy and 2018 Internationaux de France. However, they had to withdraw from NHK Trophy because of Cizeron's injury to his back. Competing at the 2018 Internationaux de France in Grenoble, they won the gold medal and set new world records in both programs and overall.  Cizeron stated: "I feel like we shared a very good moment with the audience.  It was the first time we’ve done our free program this year, so we had a little bit of stress, but I feel the audience connected to it."

After winning their fifth consecutive French national title, Papadakis/Cizeron next competed at the 2019 European Championships, which they also won for the fifth straight time, setting new world records in the process. Cizeron expressed satisfaction with the free dance, which he called "almost technically perfect." They then went on to claim their fourth World title at the 2019 World Championships, again setting new world records in the rhythm dance, free dance, and overall score. Papadakis/Cizeron concluded the season at the 2019 World Team Trophy, setting new world records in both the free skating and overall score, while Team France finished fourth overall.

2019–20 season
Eschewing the Challenger series, Papadakis/Cizeron debuted their programs at Master's de Patinage before making their first international appearance on the Grand Prix at the 2019 Internationaux de France.  They set the world record in the rhythm dance again, eight points ahead of Chock/Bates in second place.  They performed their free dance, performed mainly to spoken word poetry, and won the event by a wide margin. At 2019 NHK Trophy, they again set the world record for the rhythm dance with a score of 90.03, becoming the first couple ever in history to score over 90 points in the segment.  Winning the free dance as well, they set another set of world records and qualified first to the Grand Prix Final.

Competing at the Grand Prix Final, Papadakis stumbled out of her twizzle in the rhythm dance's midline step sequence, leading to them scoring 83.83, their lowest rhythm dance score under the post-2018 judging system.  They nevertheless placed first in that segment, albeit narrowly.  They won the free dance decisively with close to their previous world record score, winning their second Grand Prix Final gold.

After collecting another French national title, Papadakis/Cizeron competed at the 2020 European Championships in Graz.  After the rhythm dance, they were in first place, separated from Sinitsina/Katsalapov by only 0.05 points.  In a close result, they lost the free dance and in the overall result finished behind by 0.14 points, winning the silver medal.  This marked the first time anyone had beaten Papadakis/Cizeron since Virtue/Moir at the 2018 Winter Olympics, and the first time they had been defeated in the free dance since the 2016–17 Grand Prix Final.  The result was considered a major upset, with Katsalapov remarking "to get anywhere near Gabriella and Guillaume seemed impossible for all the skaters."  Papadakis said "we can't always win and we accept that. It is a lesson for us that we probably needed. We knew the competition was very close, so yes, we knew we did not have room for mistakes, and we made them."

The European result generated immediate speculation that Sinitsina/Katsalapov could challenge Papadakis/Cizeron for gold at the 2020 World Championships in Montreal, but these were cancelled as a result of the coronavirus pandemic.

2020–21 season
With the pandemic affecting international travel, the ISU opted to assign the Grand Prix based primarily on geographic location, but Papadakis/Cizeron were nonetheless assigned to the 2020 Internationaux de France, necessitating traveling from Canada to France.  However, the Internationaux was ultimately cancelled due to the pandemic as well.  Both skaters contracted COVID-19 in July 2020, after contact with a third individual, resulting in them being away from the ice for three weeks.

On 11 November 2020, L'Équipe reported that Papadakis/Cizeron would skip both the French and European championships for that season to focus on the World Championships in Stockholm, citing the difficulty of traveling back and forth between countries frequently.

On 20 January 2021, Papadakis/Cizeron announced that they would withdraw from the World Championships and would instead be focusing on the 2021/2022 season and the 2022 Olympics. Cizeron stated their reason: "We have never known such a long time without skating. The series of cancellations provoked a climate of uncertainty and doubt that is difficult for all top-level athletes to manage."

2021–22 season
Entering the Olympic season, Papadakis/Cizeron had not decided whether this would be their final competitive year, with Papadakis stating they were "both in that mindset of let's do this season, let's train for the Olympics and then we will see." For the street dance-themed rhythm dance, the duo enlisted outside choreographer Axelle Munezero to work on a program based on waacking, a dance style created in Los Angeles' LGBT clubs during the Disco Era. Papadakis and Cizeron spent six months studying the history of the dance before beginning the choreographic process, with Munezero saying she approached it as if she was "training dancers that wanted to become waackers and do that as a living."

The team began the year at the 2021 CS Finlandia Trophy, winning the gold medal. Shortly afterward a controversy emerged relating to homophobic comments made by Russian skating judge Alexander Vedenin, who said that due to Cizeron's homosexuality there would always be a lack of chemistry between the partners. The French federation wrote a letter to the International Skating Union in response.

Papadakis/Cizeron were initially assigned to the 2021 Cup of China as their first Grand Prix, but after its cancellation, they were reassigned to the 2021 Gran Premio d'Italia in Turin. They won both segments and the event, taking the gold medal. Cizeron cited improved levels on elements since the Finlandia Trophy as their main takeaway, while saying further improvement was necessary. At their second event, the 2021 Internationaux de France, Papadakis/Cizeron again won gold. Performing at home in their own country, Papadakis said they "appreciate it now after the pandemic that it is possible to have an event with such a big audience." Their results qualified them for the Grand Prix Final, but it was subsequently cancelled due to restrictions prompted by the Omicron variant.

After winning the French national title again, Papadakis/Cizeron were named to the French Olympic team and opted to withdraw from the 2022 European Championships to avoid the risk of the Omicron variant prior to the Olympics.

Competing at the 2022 Winter Olympics in Beijing, Papadakis/Cizeron began the dance event with a record-setting rhythm dance score of 90.83, 1.98 points ahead of Russian rivals Sinitsina/Katsalapov in second. Papadakis said they were "positively superstitious" about the Olympics as "we've always skated very well in China, and why should it be different this time?" They also went on to win the free dance, setting a new world record for total score (226.98). Cizeron said that "the silver four years ago made us to want the gold medal more than anything else. I think we've never worked that hard for a specific goal throughout our career. All the gold medals came one after the other without us really wanting them as a precise goal. This year we gathered the courage actually to want to win."

Papadakis and Cizeron concluded the season at the 2022 World Championships, held on home soil in Montpellier. Longtime rivals Sinitsina/Katsalapov were absent due to the International Skating Union banning all Russian athletes due to their country's invasion of Ukraine. They won the rhythm dance by a world record score of 92.73, 3.01 points over training mates Hubbell/Donohue. In the free dance they set another world record (137.09) as well as a world record for total score (229.82), taking their fifth World title. With Hubbell/Donohue taking the silver medal and Chock/Bates the bronze, the entire podium consisted of skaters from the Ice Academy of Montreal. Papadakis remarked "we're so lucky to have been surrounded by our closest friends here on the podium. I think that's very rare and it's what makes it worth it – gold medals, and the event, and the work. I think friendship, in the end, is what stays."

2022–23 season
In June of 2022, Papadakis and Cizeron announced that they would take a one-year break from competition, but would not rule out returning and pushing for the 2026 Winter Olympics. Cizeron said, "if we were stopping for good, we'd say it." On the possibility of continuing, Papadakis added "creating something new coupled with our will as artists would be a reason to come back. You need an inner fire to compete."

World record scores

Programs

(with Cizeron)

Competitive highlights
GP: Grand Prix; CS: Challenger Series; JGP: Junior Grand Prix

With Cizeron

2013–14 to present

2007–08 to 2012-13

Detailed results
Small medals for short and free programs awarded only at ISU Championships. At team events, medals awarded for team results only.

Personal Bests are in bold. World record scores are in italics.

With Cizeron

Senior career
Record in 2017-2018 Season marks the historical world records set before the introduction of the +5/-5 GOE judging system

Junior career

References

External links

1995 births
Living people
French female ice dancers
Sportspeople from Clermont-Ferrand
Figure skaters at the 2018 Winter Olympics
Figure skaters at the 2022 Winter Olympics
Olympic figure skaters of France
Olympic gold medalists for France
Olympic silver medalists for France
Olympic medalists in figure skating
Medalists at the 2018 Winter Olympics
Medalists at the 2022 Winter Olympics
World Figure Skating Championships medalists
World Junior Figure Skating Championships medalists
European Figure Skating Championships medalists
Season's world number one figure skaters
French people of Greek descent